Dragan Miranović (Cyrillic: Драган Мирановић; 18 May 1956 – 19 March 2012) was a professional football manager and player.

Playing career

Club
Miranović was born in Feketić, Vojvodina, Serbia, Yugoslavia. Miranović started playing football in his hometown, before joining Vojvodina's youth system. He later went on to spend 11 seasons with Spartak Subotica, making his Yugoslav First League debut in the 1986–87 campaign, before going abroad. After playing for two years with SV Spittal in Austria, Miranović moved to Ecuador and played for Valdez, before retiring from the game.

Managerial career
During his managerial career, Miranović worked at numerous South American clubs, including Olmedo (four times), Deportivo Quito, El Nacional, Atlético Junior and Aucas (each twice), as well as Barcelona SC, Independiente Santa Fe, Millonarios and Deportivo Cuenca. He also led Peru at the 1995 South American U-20 Championship.

Death
On 19 March 2012, Miranović died in Quito of a heart attack at the age of 55. A number of his former players expressed their sympathy and condolences to the family and friends, including Antonio Valencia and Claudio Pizarro.

Statistics

Manager

References

External links
 

1956 births
2012 deaths
Serbian people of Montenegrin descent
Association football midfielders
Yugoslav footballers
FK Spartak Subotica players
SV Spittal players
Yugoslav First League players
Yugoslav expatriate footballers
Expatriate footballers in Austria
Yugoslav expatriate sportspeople in Austria
Expatriate footballers in Ecuador
Yugoslav expatriate sportspeople in Ecuador
Serbia and Montenegro football managers
S.D. Quito managers
C.D. El Nacional managers
Barcelona S.C. managers
C.D. Olmedo managers
Independiente Santa Fe managers
Atlético Junior managers
Millonarios F.C. managers
S.D. Aucas managers
C.D. Cuenca managers
Montenegrin football managers
FK Spartak Subotica managers
Serbian SuperLiga managers
Serbia and Montenegro expatriate football managers
Expatriate football managers in Ecuador
Serbia and Montenegro expatriate sportspeople in Ecuador
Expatriate football managers in Peru
Expatriate football managers in Bolivia
Serbia and Montenegro expatriate sportspeople in Bolivia
Expatriate football managers in Colombia
Serbia and Montenegro expatriate sportspeople in Colombia